The Gansu Provincial Museum is a museum in Lanzhou, China. Its collections include over 350,000 artefacts, in two main sections: history and natural science. Since its foundation, the museum has held almost 300 exhibitions, and items from its collections have been exhibited worldwide. The museum was originally only for the history of Gansu itself, but was re-purposed in 1956 to be a natural history museum, after three years of renovations.

Exhibitions 
A major holding of the museum is the Flying Horse of Gansu, a bronze sculpture from Eastern Han dynasty, around the 2nd century AD. Apart from this, the museum has permanent exhibitions on:
 Buddhist art
 Fossils and paleontology
 Painted pottery
 Silk Road civilization
 'Red Gansu' (Communist Party during the Chinese Civil War)

See also
 Gansu Flying Horse
 Silk Route Museum

References

External links

 Travel China Guide

Museums in Gansu
Buildings and structures in Lanzhou
Paleontology in Gansu
National first-grade museums of China